Turshiz ( Turshēz), also known as Turaythith, is a medieval district and city of the Quhistan region. It corresponds to the Kashmar area, located in the present-day Razavi Khorasan Province, Iran. This region is divided into four regions Kashmar County, Kuhsorkh County, Khalilabad County and Bardaskan County.

Gallery

See also 
 Kashmar
 Adur Burzen-Mihr
 Cypress of Kashmar

References

Ancient Iranian cities
Historical regions of Iran
Kashmar County